Cychrus turnai is a species of ground beetle in the subfamily Carabinae that is endemic to Sichuan province in China. It was described by Deuve in 1994.

References

turnai
Beetles described in 1994
Endemic fauna of Sichuan
Beetles of Asia